Victor Vancier (born December 25, 1956), commonly referred to by his Hebrew name, Chaim Ben Pesach is an American political activist and the founder and director of the United States-based Kahanist organization, Jewish Task Force (JTF) and the former National Chairman of the Jewish Defense League (JDL) in the United
States. In 1987, he was convicted on charges related to a series of terrorist bombings conducted during his time with the JDL to protest Soviet treatment of Jews. He served over five years in federal prison for his involvement in 18 bombings in New York and Washington.

Activities and imprisonment
Pesach was the National Chairman of the Jewish Defense League, but resigned in December 1978 after he went to jail for bombing Egyptian targets in an effort to stop the Israeli withdrawal from the Sinai Peninsula. After his release and upon the completion of his probation in July 1983, Rabbi Meir Kahane again appointed Pesach to be National Chairman of the JDL. During the 1980s, Pesach was arrested again, along with two other JDL members in connection with six incidents; a 1984 firebombing of an automobile at a Soviet diplomatic residence, the 1985 and 1986 fire and pipe bombings of an FBI informer's car, the 1986 firebombing at a hall where the Soviet State Symphony Orchestra was performing, and two 1986 detonations of tear gas grenades to protest performances by Soviet dance
companies.

On November 26, 1986 he was arrested outside the Penta Hotel with a tear gas grenade after a fire broke out in the tunnels under the hotel where the Soviet Moiseyev Dance Company, was staying. He was charged with a federal weapons violation and was sentenced to 10 years in prison. Pesach said he did this in the hopes of influencing the Soviet Union to allow Jewish emigration. His court-appointed lawyer Thomas Concannon said about him that it is "fair to say he's a little bit nuts". The judge Israel Leo Glasser regarded Pesach as "a danger to this community". Pesach committed his attacks together with other accomplices. One of his accomplices, at that time 24 years old Jay Cohen, committed suicide after facing a possible maximum prison sentence of 20 years. Pesach said at that time that he felt personally responsible for Cohen's death. The JDL, as overseen by Pesach, is also believed to be responsible for the 1982 fire set at the Tripoli Restaurant on Atlantic Avenue in Brooklyn, New York, which destroyed it, killing one person and injuring seven. An anonymous caller claiming to represent the JDL telephoned news organizations to take credit for the arson, justifying the attack by stating the restaurant was the undercover headquarters in New York City of the Palestine Liberation Organization, though JDL officials denied having any involvement in the attack.

Jewish Task Force
Pesach is the current head of the Jewish Task Force, a Kahanist organization in the United States. Pesach created JTF in 1991. The Jewish Task Force raises money for the claimed purpose of funding Jewish settlers in the West Bank and runs a website with the stated goal of saving Israel, America, and the West. Pesach is banned from entering Israel because of his terrorist acts and his Kahanist associations, which are outlawed in Israel.

The Jewish Task Force program aired on public access television in the mid-1990s, in Manhattan, Brooklyn, and Queens. Pesach became known for his criticisms of African American culture that included resorting to racial slurs and offensive stereotypes, as well as his views on homosexuality, and he was criticized in local magazines and newspapers as a result. In the context of state comptroller elections, in one instance, after lauding one candidate, Herbert London, as "a real Jewish man", he derided London's opponent, Carl McCall, an African American, as "a low, Jew-hating, Jew-killing cockroach". He further described attorney general candidate Karen Burstein as a "disgusting, ugly lesbian" and continued:

Pesach has described Baruch Goldstein, who perpetrated the 1994 Cave of the Patriarchs massacre, as "a great hero".

Pesach has referred to Nelson Mandela as a "Black Nazi", Yasser Arafat as the "Arab Hitler" and a "Muslim terrorist pedophile who died of
AIDS". He has also targeted former First Lady and senator Hillary Clinton and former U.S. President George W. Bush on his website, calling Clinton "Hillary Sodom Arafat" and Bush "Jorge Wahabi Bush" whom he calls a "low, disgusting traitor" and "excrement". He also uses language such as "schvartze" when referring to African-Americans and "kike" for Jews he considers to be traitors. JTF's messages have been condemned for "racism" by the Anti-Defamation League.

See also
 Kahanism
 Rabbi Meir Kahane
 Jewish Defense League
 Domestic terrorism in the United States

References

Further reading

External links
 Jewish Task Force website

1956 births
Living people
American activists
American Internet celebrities
Jewish American community activists
American Kahanists
American Orthodox Jews
American commentators
Male critics of feminism
American people imprisoned on charges of terrorism
Bombers (people)
Activists from New York City
21st-century American Jews